Michal Suchánek (born 27 October 1987) is a Canadian actor, born in the former Czechoslovakia.

Biography
Suchánek debuted in his first role in The Nutcracker. His career accelerated after he signed with Evangelista in Vancouver, and he received many offers to do commercials which were broadcast in Canada and the U.S.

He has also appeared on TV movies and programs, such as Sleepwalkers, X-Files, Hope Island, Zalinda's Story, Dirty Little Secret, Noah, Unconditional Love (TV), Y2K, and Pelts. He appeared in HBO's Edison: The Wizard of Light for which he received an Emmy nomination.

He was nominated for a Young Artist Award in connection with his performance in Aftershock: Earthquake in New York, mini-series. His father, who holds a master's in performing arts, is his acting coach. a Canadian citizen, he divides his time between Los Angeles and Vancouver, British Columbia.

Filmography
 The Andromeda Strain (2008) (TV) .... Lance Stone
 Aliens vs. Predator: Requiem (2007) .... Nick
 Masters of Horror: Pelts (2006) .... Larry Jameson
 Various Positions (2002) .... Tzvi Szchevisky
 Big Brother Trouble (2000) .... Mitch Dobson
 Y2K (1999) (TV) .... Donny Cromwell
 Aftershock: Earthquake in New York (1999) (TV) .... Danny Thorell
 Dudley Do-Right (1999) .... Ten Year Old Boy
 A Murder on Shadow Mountain (1999) (TV) .... Kurt Traynor
 Noah (1998) (TV) .... Benny Waters
 Dirty Little Secret (1998) (TV) .... Charlie Ramer
 Edison: The Wizard of Light (1998) (TV) .... Young Jack Maloney

References

External links
 

Male actors from Vancouver
Canadian male television actors
Canadian male film actors
Canadian male voice actors
Living people
1987 births